Erling Gripp (15 January 1923 – 25 January 1957) was a Norwegian footballer. He played in one match for the Norway national football team in 1947.

References

External links
 

1923 births
1957 deaths
Norwegian footballers
Norway international footballers
Place of birth missing
Association footballers not categorized by position